The 2016 Judo Grand Slam Baku was held in Baku, Azerbaijan, from 6 to 8 May 2016.

Medal summary

Men's events

Women's events

Source Results

Medal table

References

External links
 

2016 IJF World Tour
2016 Judo Grand Slam
Judo
Grand Slam Baku 2016
Judo
Judo